B.J. Caruana is an Australian singer and songwriter. Her debut single "Dance All Night" peaked at #51 on the ARIA Singles Chart. The follow up "Bump" peaked at #83.
 
Caruana appeared in the 2021 series of The Voice.

Discography

Albums

Singles

References

Australian musicians
Living people
Year of birth missing (living people)